Ardens Historic District is a national historic district which encompasses the three villages of Arden, Ardentown and Ardencroft, New Castle County, Delaware.  It encompasses 563 contributing buildings, 21 contributing sites, 15 contributing structures, and 6 contributing objects.

It was listed on the National Register of Historic Places in 2003.

References

Historic districts on the National Register of Historic Places in Delaware
Historic districts in New Castle County, Delaware
National Register of Historic Places in New Castle County, Delaware